Ginger F. Zaimis is an American author, poet, polymath, thought leader, adviser, literary translator, friend of philosophy, photographer and serial creative who specializes in architectural forms. Her vision blurs the minimal to monumental, abstract to literal while re-connecting multi-disciplinary dialogues that reunite the Humanities and Sciences as a whole while integrating contemporary modernisms and comparative literature.

She has appropriated and translated portions of Ancient Greek mythology, philosophy and poetry with emphasis on Heraclitus' ideology and Stoicism though not limited to.

Biography 
A polymath and serial creative educated in the arts, architecture, and economics, she is both Southerner and Philhellene who lived her early years in New York City. Her professional dialogues span from advisory work, communications (i.e. lecturing, reading, writing, editing) and the ancient world from Fortune 500 companies and financial institutions to art collections, museums, centers for the contemporary arts, architecture and literature as well as New York publishing houses, world libraries, and academic institutions.

Grammatology

Architecture of 
Ginger's grammatology recalls Derrida's understanding of the word. Her poetry unites intersections of contemporary modernisms and comparative literature through the lens of architecture braiding mythology and philosophy to connect multi-disciplinary dialogues re-integrating the arts and sciences as one through poetry. Her work with the sonnet, form and verse has been associated with the school of New Formalism. She is the architect of two poetic forms: the Portico and Triptych.

Poetry as text-tile 
She is the author of three poetry collections, Therapy with Antigone and the Trilogy Verses (2017), Prometheus Rebound and Other Mythology (2015) and Excavated Athens to Alexandria (2013). The author of essays and reviews, she is the architect of The Portico Convention, a treatise on poetry as architecture, as well as the co-author of Philosophy and Poetry with the Philosopher of Kairicity, E. Moutsopoulos, member of the Athens Academy.

Myth and logos in translation 
As a polyglot, she has appropriated, progressed and translated from the Modern and Ancient archetypes from Classical Greece into her own poetic oeuvre ranging from philosophical to mythological tragedy(s) questioning the death of Alexander the Great to Aeschylus' Prometheus and Sophocles' Antigone. These plays are represented in the works entitled The Divine Inquisition, Prometheus Rebound and Therapy with Antigone. A few examples of poetic work composed in sonnet cycles which progress mythos and logos from Ancient Greek philosophy into poetry, as well as Cleanthes Hymn to Zeus, a new translation from the Ancient Greek to English verse in sestinas.

Critical reviews 
Therapy with Antigone and the Trilogy Verses, the poet's third collection is critically observed by Lee Slonimsky, poet, "Pythagorean" and Literary Executor of the Daniel Hoffman Archive at the Library of Congress as "Extraordinary content with spiritual insight and academic depth…Few writers of our day can ground one part of the mind in the material world while allowing the other to roam in philosophical eternity like Ginger Zaimis...Part of her psyche…resides in the world of Heraclitus, Sophocles and the other in the light of presence…Her ability to unite dualities; synthesize opposites as One is greater than the sum of their parts". Critic, translator and co-founder, Cecile Margellos of Yale University Press/Margellos Republic of Letters writes, "Ginger's idea of mythologies through an architectural lens stand boldly at the intersection of contemporary and comparative literature... her work reveals the in-between of worlds, strata and disciplines by inventing new prototypes" while American School of Classical Studies at Athens, Maria Georgopoulou, Director of the Gennadius Library says, "Ginger is someone who bridges the arts... she doesn't fit in-to-a-box but rather perceives life out-of-the-box... bringing architectural order to the world by shaping words, poetry, and perception."

Her second collection, Prometheus Rebound and Other Mythology, Rachel Hadas critically writes, "Ginger Zaimis sometimes sounds like Heraclitus – fragmentary, abrupt, vatic and witty. Verses resonate with breathtaking peremptory wisdom... Remarkable!" while Paolo Colombo, writer, curator, and former head of the MAXXI, sees her poetry as installation. "Each word is sculpted into perfect form as architecture itself to fit the necessity of language… The sonnets are experienced as pages of diptychs that converge into triptychs, her new visual and literary, poetic hybrid, shaping abstraction into form, aether to volume, idea from void." and Elizabeth J. Coleman, vice-president of the Poetry Society of America observes, "I am in awe of Ginger Zaimis' knowledge of history and mythology, her skill and creativity with form. I love the way she weaves the current with the ancient, the high with the low...so wittily, so gracefully."

Ernest Hilbert critically observes of her first collection, Excavated Athens to Alexandria, "her intelligence sparkles... she proves that the sonnet is more than merely a little song of love, that it can and must contain multitudes of voices and address infinite concerns."

Distinctions & new poetic forms

Honors 

She has been honored to lecture, read and present her work at distinguished centers for the arts, literature, universities and world libraries such as The Keats Shelley House, Rome museum, The Athens Academy, Research Centre for Greek Philosophy, Fordham University, the Gabelli School of Business, The Gennadius Library at the American School for Classical Studies Athens, the British School at Athens, Bibliotheca Alexandrina Library, The Athens Centre, Parnassus Literary Society, the Berlin Biennial, Manifesta Biennial, Mass MoCA museum and The Century Association Arts Club in NYC to name a few.

Her debut collection, Excavated Athens to Alexandria, a didactic collection inspired by Classical Greece and Hellenistic Alexandria, explores language as architecture and architecture as poetry. She is PEN America’s Poetry Finalist (2015) for best, first collection. Her poems have been collected in the Library of Alexandria, Poetry Anthologies (2014, 2015, 2017 & 2019), IFBA Press. She has served as judge for the Keats-Shelley Poetry Prize and her first two collections, Excavated Athens to Alexandria and Prometheus Rebound and Other Mythology were nominated for the London Hellenic Prize. An American who "navigates the world and her life with grace, elegance…Her poetic voice is fresh and unexpected: tough, tender, funny, fierce, risky and sometimes risqué...mixing high-register diction with a vernacular of Southern sassiness”, writes A.E. Stallings while Rachel Hadas and Lee Slonimsky liken her poetic voice and verse to a contemporary Heraclitus and Sophocles. She is the architect of the two new poetic forms: the Portico and Triptych.

The Portico 
The Portico was the poet's first form she designed. It was inspired by the facade of a classical temple's porch or portico. "It is a defined poetic shape, written in verse that employs specific design elements to achieve a result of sound – silence – sound. The new form uses architecture as a connective matrix to unite the literary arts which incorporate aesthetic, rhythmic and verse qualities. It was designed in 2012–13. It is founded upon classical architectural fundamentals that emulate the design of a classical temple, specifically, the colonnaded portico from which it has appropriates its name. Its concept is premised upon Vitruvius architectural principles." Poetry's new form is outlined in her treatise entitled, The Portico Convention."

The poems, Propylaia and The Caryatids, are some of the first prototypes that were used to develop the convention. The former, Propylaia, is appropriated from the Propylaia at the Acropolis and Englished from the Greek meaning an entrance; gateway to. The latter, references the Erechtheion Temple at the Acropolis and the origins of the Caryatids, re-told through her poetry, "Portico of six ||| rhomb adjacent to ||| Beauty eurhythmic ||| adjoined carefully two ||| Maidens of the Caryae ||| All from Laconia ||| Commitment lifetime ||| obligation diva..." based upon M. Vitruvius Pollio provenance in De Architectura. The Portico is dedicated to T.S. Eliot.

Triptych 
The poet's second poetic form, the Triptych, the design model pays homage to the ancient Homeric epigram plus two lines, the Greek haiku and Rothko. "It is a conversion of the classically contemporary visual and literary arts as I imagine it poetically, and how Rothko might have re-imagined it."
The triptych form was first presented in the poet's second collection, Prometheus Rebound and the Other Mythology. "The triptych...distills thought that recounts impressions and incidents as rhythmic, mural imagery in bits of three brushed onto paper. Like painting or architecture, it integrates text-tile and space as it delineates the nuance of original shape redrawing boundary while solidifying synergy premised on archetype models." Examples include: LULL, a commission for A Poet's Agora (2016), After the last before the first and Wyrd worker.

The triptych form is further explored and experimented in the poet's third collection, Therapy with Antigone and the Trilogy Verses, encompassing a third of the collection.

Bibliography

Monographs and collections 
 "Therapy with Antigone and the Trilogy Verses" (Spuyten Duyvil, 2017). 
"Prometheus Rebound and Other Mythology" (Blue Scarab Press, 2015). 
"Philosophy and Poetry", co-author E. Moutsopoulos, (Library of Alexandria, IFBA Press, 2014). 
"Excavated Athens to Alexandria" (Blue Scarab Press, 2013). , 978-1-938963-05-6
"The Portico Convention" (Blue Scarab Press, 2013). , 978-1-938963-07-0
"Monumental Athens Urban" (Squared Editions, 2012).

Journals, anthologies and features 

"Bright Yellow Buzz" feat. by Lee Slonimsky (Spuyten Duyvil, 2022). 
"Authors Tell Their Stories", Anthology, (Book Place Media, 2023). 979-8-3750-1628-3
"Wings of Thought" Anthology, A Poet's Agora (Xlibris, 2021). , 978-1-6641-2976-4}}
"Poetry Anthologies" (Bibliotheca Alexandrina, 2014,2015, 2017 & 2019).
 "The Romantics and Greece: Myth, Transcendence, Art, Beauty and Love" (Keats-Shelley Review, Taylor Francis Publications, Vol. 31, Issue 2, 2017). , 
"Cleanthes’ Hymn to Zeus, transl. from Ancient Greek to English verse, (Library of Alexandria, 11th Poetry Anthology, "Reaching for the Stars", IFBA Press, 2017).
"Fairy Tale Logic: Mythology to Philosophy and the Text-tile of" (Athens Academy, Research Centre for Greek Philosophy, PHILOSOPHIA, Vol. 46, 2016). 
"O-dyss-epic, (Library of Alexandria, 9th Poetry Anthology, IFBA Press, 2014).
"Architecture of Public Policy: A master plan draft, architecture as politics" (VOLUME Project, Columbia University C-Lab, AMO & Archis Foundation, NYC, Vol. 30, 2012).

Readings, talks, plays and exhibitions

Readings 
 "Athens,  Alexandria & Rome" Keynote, @MoonstationAthens, December 2022
 "Pop-up Poetry Series" @Acropolis of Athens, with Carol Goodman, Lee Slonimsky & G.F. Zaimis, November 2021
 An Evening of Poetry with the Centurians, Poetry@Century Association, NYC, November 2020
 "International Poetry Society" Keynote, "Shelley, Byron and the Italian, Greek Years"  @Free Thinking Zone, Athens, October 2020
 Excerpts from a NEW translation from Ancient Greek to English Verse of "Aristophanes' Frogs", Poetry@Bibliotheca Alexandrina, Alexandria October 2019
 "10th International Arts Council Conference" Chair, IARC, Acropolis  Museum Athens, October 2019
 "Poetry@theCentury", 10th Anniversary of Poetry@theCentury, Century Association Arts Club, NYC, March 2018
"ODYSSEY 2017", Read in the Languages of the World", Athens Concert Hall, Time stamp 2:00, Summer 2017
 "LULL", A Poets' Agora, Athens, December 2016

Lectures, papers & presentations with poetry 
 "Keats and me: Dialogues with a Grecian Urn and Other Poems", Festival of Writing and Ideas: the Journey, British School at Athens, March 2023
 "Between the Lines: Reading the Is and Not", Keynote, London Lecture Series,  Philosophy & Literature, Fordham University & Gabelli School of Business, London, February 2023
 Poetry in Dedication for Presidential Reception Welcome, Excerpts from a NEW Ancient Greek to English Verse translation of Marcus Aurelius' "Meditations", Fordham University at the Shard, London, October 2022
 "Axioms of Thought Re-connecting the Dots", Keynote, Gabelli School of Business & Fordham University Lecture Series, March 2021
 "Shelley, Byron and the Italian, Greek Years", Keynote, International Poetry Society Lecture Series, Athens, March 2020
"The Romantics and Greece: Myth, Transcendence, Art and Beauty", Keats-Shelley House, Rome, February 2017
"Poetic Impressions: Heraclitean Perspectives" The Athens Centre, June 2017
"Balancing Pythagorean and Heraclitean Themes", Athens Academy, Research Centre for Greek Philosophy, Lee Slonimsky and Ginger F. Zaimis, November 2016
"Fairy Tale Logic: Mythology to Philosophy through Poetry", Gennadius Library, American School of Classical Studies Athens, October 2016

Book presentations 
"Prometheus Rebound and Other Mythology ", Athens Centre 2015
"Excavated Athens to Alexandria", Parnassos Literary Society, 2013

Plays & theatrical works 
 Excerpts from a NEW translation from Ancient Greek to English Verse of "Aristophanes' Frogs", Poetry@Bibliotheca Alexandrina, Alexandria, October 2019
"Prometheus Rebound", Cast: Orfeas Apergis, Eliza Jackson, A.E. Stallings, Paolo Colombo & Ginger F. Zaimis, February 2015
"The Divine Inquisition", Cast: Elena Penga, A.E. Stallings, Joanna Papadopoulos & Ginger F. Zaimis, Parnassos Literary Society, December 2013

Exhibitions 
"Sleep", Collector's Edition Poem "Industrial Strength Sleep" by Ginger F. Zaimis, written for Ed Ruscha's installation with the same title, IBID Gallery, LA, 2016, curated by Paolo Colombo
"Sleep", Art & Poetry exhibition with Ed Ruscha, Rosemarie Trockel, Robert Gober, Felix Gonzalez-Torres, IBID Gallery, LA, 2016, curated by Paolo Colombo
"Architect of Public Policy" 7th Berlin Biennale curated by Artur Żmijewski
"Abstract Shapes and Forms" Agency of Unrealized Projects curated by Hans-Ulrich Obrist
"A Dialogue with Sol LeWitt" MASS MoCA curated by Regine Basha
"A Digital City of Art and Architecture" Manifesta Biennale co-curated by Ole Bouman
"Digital City" Deste Foundation curated by Katerina Gregos

External links 
 Gingerfzaimis.com website
 YouTube channel
 Poetry Out-loud in Translation, C.P. Cavafy
 Poetry Out-loud Series, "Shakespeare's Sonnet XX"
 Poetry Out-loud Series, "Face of Agamemnon"

References 

American women poets
21st-century American poets
20th-century American poets
American women photographers
Formalist poets
Romanticism
Poets from South Carolina
Writers from South Carolina
The New Yorker people
Place of birth missing (living people)
American expatriates in Greece
Living people
Year of birth missing (living people)
21st-century American women artists